Allelujah! is a play by British playwright Alan Bennett.

Characters and cast

Patients
 Mavis - Patricia England
 Lucille - Gwen Taylor
 Hazel - Sue Wallace
 Mary - Julia Foster
 Cora - Cleo Sylvestre
 Mrs Maudsley - Jaqueline Clarke
 Molly - Jacqueline Chan
 Renee - Anna Lindup
 Neville - Louis Mahoney
 Joe - Jeff Rawle
 Ambrose - Simon Williams
 Arthur - Colin Haig

Staff
 Salter - Chairman of the hospital - Peter Forbes
 Dr Valentine - Sacha Dhawan
 Sister Gilchrist - Deborah Findlay
 Nurse Pinkney - Nicola Hughes
 Ramesh - a junior doctor - Manish Gandhi
 Fletcher - a junior doctor - Gary Wood
 Gerald - physiotherapist - Richie Hart

Visitors
 Colin Colman - Joe's son, a management consultant - Samuel Barnett
 Mrs Earnshaw - Rosie Ede
 Mr Earnshaw - Duncan Wisbey
 Andy - work experience - David Moorst
 Alex - documentary director - Sam Bond
 Cliff - camerman - Nadine Higgin

Nurses, healthcare assistants, social workers etc. were played by members of the company.

Production 
The play opened at the Bridge Theatre, London on 11 July 2018, running until 29 September, directed by Nicholas Hytner, designed by Bob Crowley and choreographed by Arlene Phillips.

The production was captured by National Theatre Live and was broadcast to cinemas worldwide on 1 November 2018.

Film 

Allelujah is a 2022 film adaptation of Alan Bennett's play starring Jennifer Saunders, Bally Gill, Russell Tovey, David Bradley, Derek Jacobi, and Judi Dench, and directed by Richard Eyre.

References 

Plays by Alan Bennett
2018 plays
British plays adapted into films